Leon Kachelhoffer is a Botswanan trophy hunter who caused an international outcry for killing a circa 45-year-old rare and well-known 'big tusker' elephant in Botswana in 2022 alongside a smaller second elephant.

Kachelhoffer, who is working as a professional hunter within the African wildlife since 2002, was reportedly paid $50,000, of which a large portion went directly to the community in which the elephant was hunted, to kill the biggest elephant professionally hunted since 1996. The former Botswanan President Ian Khama criticized that Kachelhoffer had killed ‘one of the largest if not the largest tusker in the country' that had furthermore been a 'tourist attraction for tour operators'.

Kachelhoffer justified his killing by stating that poachers may otherwise have targeted the elephant for its ivory, had he not shot the animal himself. Kachelhoffer furthermore stated in podcasts that elephant hunting would raise awareness for animals among people that otherwise do not have attachment points with such species.

When asked about the case, Dr. Dilys Roe of the International Union for Conservation of Nature (IUCN) confirmed that paid elephant hunting could have a positive impact on wildlife, highlighting that "if nothing can be earned with wildlife, the local population would rather convert the hunting grounds into agricultural land and kill the animals themselves".

See also 
Other notable animals killed by hunters and poachers:
 Killing of Cecil the Lion
 Pedals (bear)
 Romeo (wolf)
 Vince (rhinoceros): killed by poachers near Paris
 Endangered species
 Big five game
 Elephant gun

References

Sources 

Botswana people
Living people
Year of birth missing (living people)
2022 controversies
2022 in Botswana
Hunters
April 2022 events in Africa